Little Gandhi is a 2016 Syrian documentary film directed by Sam Kadi. It was selected as the Syrian entry for the Best Foreign Language Film at the 90th Academy Awards, but it was not nominated. It was the first time Syria had sent a film for consideration for the Best Foreign Language film.

Synopsis
A documentary film about the life of Syrian activist Ghiath Matar, whose advocacy for nonviolent protest gave him the nickname "Little Gandhi".

See also
 List of submissions to the 90th Academy Awards for Best Foreign Language Film
 List of Syrian submissions for the Academy Award for Best Foreign Language Film

References

External links
 

2016 films
2016 documentary films
Syrian documentary films
2010s Arabic-language films